Bistra is a dispersed settlement in the valley of Bistra Creek (from which it gets its name), a tributary of the Meža River, and the surrounding hills southwest of Črna na Koroškem in the Carinthia region in northern Slovenia.

References

External links
Bistra on Geopedia

Populated places in the Municipality of Črna na Koroškem